Barrie Bretland (19 April 1928 – 28 October 1998) was an Australian rules footballer who played with Geelong in the Victorian Football League (VFL).

Bretland, a Golden Point recruit, joined Geelong in 1949. He played eight senior games that year and another seven in the 1950 VFL season. A utility, Bretland was made captain of the Geelong seconds in 1952 but before the beginning of the season was lured to Shepparton to coach Lemnos.
 
He later became known as a sports journalist.

References

External links

1928 births
Australian rules footballers from Victoria (Australia)
Geelong Football Club players
Golden Point Football Club players
Shepparton Swans Football Club players
Australian sports journalists
1998 deaths